"Personally" is a song by Nigerian duo P-Square. It was released as the second single from their sixth studio album, Double Trouble (2014). The music video for the song was directed by Jude Engees Okoye and Clarence Peters. It was uploaded onto Vevo on June 21, 2013, and features a cameo appearance from Osita Iheme. "Personally" claimed the number 1 spot on MTV Base's Official Naija Top 10 Chart from August 10 through August 22, 2013.

Musical influences and appreciation
P-Square paid tribute to Michael Jackson, who inspired them to dance, sing and write songs. Moreover, they dedicated the music video to him, adding, "He lives on and inspires us Personally". In a thank you video to the duo, Jermaine Jackson said, "It's not everyday that a phenomenal band comes along…..Psquare, they are absolutely sensational with the showmanship, the singing, the dancing.."

Accolades
"Personally" earned P-Square a nomination for Best International Performance at the 2013 Soul Train Music Awards. It was nominated for Song of the Year at the 2014 MTV Africa Music Awards. The music video for "Personally" was nominated for Best Music Video of the Year at the 2014 Nigeria Entertainment Awards. The music video was also nominated for Most Gifted Dance at the 2014 Channel O Music Video Awards.

Track listing

 Digital single

Charts

Weekly charts

References

P-Square songs
2013 singles
2013 songs